Buah Nabar is a village in Sibolangit, Deli Serdang Regency, North Sumatra, Indonesia.

Air disaster 
On September 26, 1997, Garuda Indonesia Flight 152 crashed near the village, killing all 234 people on board. It is the deadliest aviation disaster to occur in Indonesia.

References 

Populated places in North Sumatra